Nemanja Gojačanin (born 29 April 1993) is a Montenegrin footballer who plays as a right-back.

Club career
Born in Bijelo Polje, he played with FK Jedinstvo Bijelo Polje youth team since 2008.  He made a debut for Jedinstvo senior team in the season 2011–12 in the Montenegrin Second League.  Jedinstvo finished third and got promoted with Gojačanin making 25 appearances that season and scoring once.  In the following season, 2012–13, now playing in the Montenegrin First League, Gojačanin made 23 appearances.  This regularity got him a move abroad, to Serbian side FK Javor Ivanjica.  He made a debut in the 2013–14 Serbian SuperLiga as a starter in an away match against Spartak Subotica played on August 31, 2013.

National team
Nemanja Gojačanin made a debut for the Montenegrin U-21 team as a starter in a qualifying match for the 2013 UEFA European Under-21 Football Championship against the Czech Republic, played on September 7, 2012.

References

External links
 

1993 births
Living people
People from Bijelo Polje
Association football fullbacks
Montenegrin footballers
Montenegro under-21 international footballers
FK Jedinstvo Bijelo Polje players
FK Javor Ivanjica players
FK Mladost Velika Obarska players
Ängelholms FF players
Montenegrin First League players
Serbian SuperLiga players
Serbian First League players
First League of the Federation of Bosnia and Herzegovina players
Ettan Fotboll players
Montenegrin expatriate footballers
Expatriate footballers in Serbia
Montenegrin expatriate sportspeople in Serbia
Expatriate footballers in Bosnia and Herzegovina
Montenegrin expatriate sportspeople in Bosnia and Herzegovina
Expatriate footballers in Sweden
Montenegrin expatriate sportspeople in Sweden